Nuclear energy may refer to:
Nuclear power, the use of sustained nuclear fission or nuclear fusion to generate heat and electricity
Nuclear binding energy, the energy needed to fuse or split a nucleus of an atom
Nuclear potential energy, the potential energy of the particles inside an atomic nucleus
Nuclear Energy (sculpture), a bronze sculpture by Henry Moore in the University of Chicago